McTelvin Agim (born September 25, 1997) is an American football defensive end for the Indianapolis Colts of the National Football League (NFL). He played college football at Arkansas.

High school career
After playing his freshman season at Rowlett High School in Rowlett, Texas, Agim played his final three seasons of high school football at Hope High School in Hope, Arkansas. He was the top-rated player in Arkansas for the class of 2016. At various points in his high school career, Agim played defensive end, split end, running back and quarterback. The five-star recruit committed to Arkansas on September 9, 2015, choosing the Razorbacks over Baylor, Ole Miss, Texas A&M and others. After his senior season in 2016, Agim was named Gatorade Arkansas Player of the Year and a USA Today All-American.

College career
Agim cracked the starting lineup at defensive end midway through his true freshman season at Arkansas, and held that position his sophomore year before splitting time between defensive end and defensive tackle, still starting all 12 games as a junior. After his junior season, coach Chad Morris looked to shift Agim from defensive end to defensive tackle and told him to leave the program if he wasn't comfortable with that. After his senior season, Agim was a late addition to the roster of the 2020 Senior Bowl. He also participated in the East-West Shrine Game and 2020 NFL Combine.

Professional career

Denver Broncos
Agim was selected by the Denver Broncos with the 95th overall pick in the third round of the 2020 NFL Draft. The Broncos acquired this selection by trading wide receiver Emmanuel Sanders to the San Francisco 49ers. Before his rookie season, Agim chose to wear jersey number 95 because he was drafted 95th overall.

On August 30, 2022, Agim was waived by the Broncos and signed to the practice squad the next day. He was released on December 13.

Indianapolis Colts
On December 15, 2022, Agim was signed to the Indianapolis Colts practice squad. He signed a reserve/future contract on January 9, 2023.

Personal life
Agim grew up in a low-income family in Texarkana, Texas. He faced hunger issues as a child and occasionally shoplifted, leading to at least one weekend in juvenile detention at age fourteen. He won two Arkansas high school state shot put championships. Agim is nicknamed "Sosa" because of his similar appearance to Chief Keef.

References

External links
Arkansas Razorbacks bio
Denver Broncos bio

1997 births
Living people
People from Texarkana, Texas
American football defensive linemen
Players of American football from Texas
Arkansas Razorbacks football players
Denver Broncos players
Indianapolis Colts players